Margaretha Cornelia Boellaard (9 February 1795, Utrecht – 5 November 1872, Utrecht) was a Dutch painter, lithographer and art collector.

Biography
She came from a wealthy noble family. Her father, Johan Diderick, was the Heer (Baron or Lord) of  Zuilichem. Her mother, Margaretha, died six days after she was born and her father never remarried, so she remained an only child. She received private art lessons from the portrait painters  and his son, also named  as well as the landscape painter, . In 1825, she was also able to audit classes at the Rijksakademie in Amsterdam. Frans Jacob Otto Boijmans, a noted art collector, allowed her to copy works from his collection.

Her works were exhibited in several cities. From 1826 to 1843, she was a regular participant in Amsterdam's Exhibition of Living Masters. In 1834, she received an award from the Academie Minerva for her painting Meisje met bloemen (Girl with Flowers). In 1858, she was the first woman to become an honorary member of the "Genootschap Kunstliefde", an artists' society in Utrecht. In her later years her eyesight declined. By 1864, she was unable to paint and devoted herself entirely to art collecting.

She never married so, after her death, she willed most of her belongings to the Kunstliefde, including her home on the Oudegracht, which became a museum and exhibition hall in 1905. The rental fees for the hall were put into a fund for the support of financially distressed  artists over the age of fifty. In 1984, part of this fund was used to establish the "Boellaardprijs".

References

External links

The Boellaardfonds/Boellaardprijs website
Entry on Boellaard @ the ARTindex online

1795 births
1872 deaths
19th-century Dutch painters
19th-century Dutch women artists
Dutch portrait painters
Dutch lithographers
Dutch art collectors
Artists from Utrecht
Women lithographers